A Portrait is a compilation album from alternative rock band Voice of the Beehive.  Released in Canada only, the album contained singles and tracks from the band's first two albums Let It Bee and Honey Lingers.

Track listing
"Monsters and Angels" (Bryn, Jones) – 3:38
"I Think I Love You" (Tony Romeo) – 3:13
"Look at Me" (Bryn, Jones) – 3:03
"Adonis Blue" (Bryn, Jones) – 3:40
"Little Gods" (Marvin Etzioni) – 2:37
"Just Like You" (Brett, Bryn, Jones) – 3:22
"Perfect Place" (Brooke, Bryn, Jones) – 3:33
"I Walk the Earth" (Nack) – 3:40
"Don't Call Me Baby" (Bryn, Jones) – 3:05
"I Say Nothing" (Bryn, Jones) – 3:24
"I Think I Love You" (Don Was Guilty Pleasure Mix)

1991 greatest hits albums
Voice of the Beehive albums
Albums produced by Hugh Jones (producer)
Albums produced by Don Was